Shikishela is a town in Umkhanyakude District Municipality in the KwaZulu-Natal province of South Africa.

References

Populated places in the Mtubatuba Local Municipality